Sphaerolana is a genus of isopod crustaceans in the family Cirolanidae, all of which are endemic to Mexico.

The genus Sphaerolana contains the following species: 
Sphaerolana affinis Cole & W. L. Minckley, 1970 – 
Sphaerolana interstitialis Cole & W. L. Minckley, 1970 – 
Sphaerolana karenae Rodriguez-Almaraz & Bowman, 1995 – 

All three species are on the IUCN Red List as either vulnerable species (VU) or endangered species (EN).

References

Cymothoida
Isopod genera
Freshwater crustaceans of North America
Endemic crustaceans of Mexico
Taxa named by Wendell L. Minckley
Taxonomy articles created by Polbot